Poshtkuh Rural District is a rural district (dehestan) in Chahardangeh District, Sari County, Mazandaran Province, Iran. At the 2006 census, its population was 3,885, in 971 families. The rural district has 15 villages.

References 

Rural Districts of Mazandaran Province
Sari County